Niz is the name of several rural localities in Russia:
Niz, Oshevensky Selsoviet, Kargopolsky District, Arkhangelsk Oblast, a village in Oshevensky Selsoviet of Kargopolsky District of Arkhangelsk Oblast
Niz, Ukhotsky Selsoviet, Kargopolsky District, Arkhangelsk Oblast, a village in Ukhotsky Selsoviet of Kargopolsky District of Arkhangelsk Oblast
Niz, Khavrogorsky Selsoviet, Kholmogorsky District, Arkhangelsk Oblast, a village in Khavrogorsky Selsoviet of Kholmogorsky District of Arkhangelsk Oblast
Niz, Zachachyevsky Selsoviet, Kholmogorsky District, Arkhangelsk Oblast, a village in Zachachyevsky Selsoviet of Kholmogorsky District of Arkhangelsk Oblast
Niz, Nyandomsky District, Arkhangelsk Oblast, a village in Limsky Selsoviet of Nyandomsky District of Arkhangelsk Oblast
Niz, Plesetsky District, Arkhangelsk Oblast, a village in Tarasovsky Selsoviet of Plesetsky District of Arkhangelsk Oblast
Niz, Bryansk Oblast, a settlement in Ovchinsky Selsoviet of Surazhsky District of Bryansk Oblast
Niz, Kursk Oblast, a village in Starosavinsky Selsoviet of Cheremisinovsky District of Kursk Oblast
Niz, Sverdlovsk Oblast, a village in Shalinsky District of Sverdlovsk Oblast
Niz, Chagodoshchensky District, Vologda Oblast, a village in Megrinsky Selsoviet of Chagodoshchensky District of Vologda Oblast
Niz, Kaduysky District, Vologda Oblast, a village in Chuprinsky Selsoviet of Kaduysky District of Vologda Oblast